ArduSat is an Arduino based nanosatellite, based on the CubeSat standard. It contains a set of Arduino boards and sensors. The general public will be allowed to use these Arduinos and sensors for their own creative purposes while they are in space.

ArduSat is created by NanoSatisfi LLC, an aerospace company which in the words of Phil Plait has "the goal to democratize access to space" and was founded by 4 graduate students from the International Space University in 2012.

ArduSat is the first satellite which will provide such open access to the general public to space. It is one of several crowdfunded satellites launched during the 2010s. Currently the project evolved to the company Because Learning.

Timeline of the project

Technical features

ArduSat-1 & ArduSat-X 

The ArduSat project currently consists in two identical satellites: ArduSat-1 and ArduSat-X.

See also

 2013 in spaceflight

References

External links

Satellites of the United States
CubeSats
Citizen science
2013 in spaceflight
Spacecraft launched in 2013
Kickstarter-funded spacecraft
Nanosatellites
Satellites deployed from the International Space Station
Secondary payloads